Papianilla (floruit 455) was an aristocrat of Roman Gaul.

She was the daughter of Eparchius Avitus, who rose from the Gallo-Roman senatorial aristocracy to become Western Roman Emperor from 455 to 456. Papianilla had two brothers, Agricola and Ecdicius, and possibly some sisters; she was related to another Papianilla (wife of the prefect Tonantius Ferreolus).

Before her father's rise to the throne (455), she married Sidonius Apollinaris, another aristocrat, with whom she had three or four children: Apollinaris, Severiana, Roscia and Alcima (the latter, mentioned only in Gregory of Tours and not in Sidonius letters, being possibly another name for Severiana or Roscia).

Papianilla brought her husband the estate called Avitacum in Auvergne. Her husband gave away silver vessels from their home to the poor, but she criticised him so he bought them back.

Notes

Sources 
 "Papianilla 2", Prosopography of the Later Roman Empire, Volume 2, p. 830.

5th-century Roman women
5th-century Romans
Daughters of Roman emperors